Ichic Jeulla (possibly from Ancash Quechua ichik small, little, few, qiwlla, qillwa, qiwiña gull) is a  mountain in the southern part of the Cordillera Blanca in the Andes of Peru. It is located in the Ancash Region, Recuay Province, Catac District. Ichic Jeulla lies southeast of Caullaraju.

See also 
Lake Conococha

References

Mountains of Peru
Mountains of Ancash Region